Alnaryd is a village in Karlskrona Municipality, Blekinge County, southeastern Sweden. According to the 2010 census it had a population of 53 people.

This railway was extended north to Eringsboda on 1 July 1905, and another railway was opened from Eringsboda to Älmeboda on 21 December 1910 by a different company. Because the latter was in practice an extension of the one from Nättraby to Eringsboda, it merged along with its owner into the Nättraby–Eringsboda railway the following year.

References

Populated places in Karlskrona Municipality